Jacques Castelot (born Jacques Marie Paul Éloi Storms) (11 July 1914 – 25 August 1989) was a French film actor. He appeared in more than 80 films between 1938 and 1982. His brother was the writer André Castelot and their father was the Symbolist painter Maurice Chabas. From 1940 to 1945 he was married to actress and theater director Héléna Bossis (pseudonym of Henriette Berthe Blanche Berriau).

Selected filmography

 La Marseillaise (1938)
 Love Cavalcade (1939) - Un danseur (uncredited)
 Strange Inheritance (1943) - Jean Plantel
 Monsieur des Lourdines (1943) - Le prince Stimov
 La Malibran (1944) - Lamartine
 The Island of Love (1944) - L'ami de Xénia
 Children of Paradise (1945) - Georges
 Pamela (1945) - Le prince de Carency
 Pour une nuit d'amour (1947) - Le comte de Vétheuil
 Captain Blomet (1947) - Rodolphe
 Route sans issue (1948) - Larsac
 The Murdered Model (1948) - Emile
 Les Condamnés (1948) - Le docteur Yvarne
 Dilemma of Two Angels (1948) - Le Vicomte
 Marlene (1949) - Breteville
 Maya (1949) - Ernest
 Le grand rendez-vous (1950) - Forestier
 The Paris Waltz (1950) - Le duc de Morny
 Cartouche, King of Paris (1950) - Le duc du Maine
 No Pity for Women (1950) - Le juge d'instruction
 Justice Is Done (1950) = Gilbert de Montesson - le 1er juré
 Topaze (1951) - Roger Gaëtan de Bersac
 Victor (1951) - Marc Pélicier
 Les petites Cardinal (1951) - Le baron des Glaïeuls
 Dirty Hands (1951) - Le Prince
 La plus belle fille du monde (1951) - Gabory - le président
 La Vérité sur Bébé Donge (1952) - Docteur Jalabert
 The Adventures of Mandrin (1952) - Baron de Villemure
 Forbidden Fruit (1952) - Boquet - le propriétaire du 'Poker bar'
 My Husband Is Marvelous (1952) - Christian
 The Adventurer of Chad (1953) - Commissaire Lotte
 The Other Side of Paradise (1953) - Gabriel Dautrand
 The Adventurer of Chad (1953)
 It's the Paris Life (1954)
 The Count of Monte Cristo (1954) - Gérard de Villefort
 Before the Deluge (1954) - Serge de Montesson
 Les révoltés de Lomanach (1954) - M. de Rocheville
 The Women Couldn't Care Less (1954) - Granworth Aymes
 Magnificent Obsession (1954) - Me Ritter
 One Bullet Is Enough (1954) - Me Fidler
 The Two Orphans (1954) - Marquis de Presles
 The Lovers of Manon Lescaut (1954) - Marchese de Boysson
 Casta Diva (1954) - Ernesto Tosi
 Nana (1955) - Duc de Vandeuvres
 The Adventures of Gil Blas (1956) - Marquis de Mosquera
 Meeting in Paris (1956) - Marquis Arnaud de Cernay
 Folies-Bergère (1956) - Philippe Loiselet
 Soupçons (1956) - Thierry de Villesec
 La garçonne (1957)
 The Mysteries of Paris (1957) - notaio Ferrand, ovvero 'Monsieur'
 C'est une fille de Paname (1957) - Jean Paget
 Ces dames préfèrent le mambo (1957) - Gérard Lester - l'adjoint deLegrand
 Le souffle du désir (1958) - Mario
 Prisoner of the Volga (1959) - Jakowlew
 Le secret du Chevalier d'Éon (1959) - Le marquis de l'Hospital
 Marie of the Isles (1959) - Le comte Cheneau de Saint-André
 The Baron of the Locks (1960) - Marquis François-Marie de Villamayor
 Austerlitz (1960) - Cambacérès
 The Warrior Empress (1960) - Soldier (uncredited)
 Dans l'eau qui fait des bulles (1961) - Baumann
 La Fayette (1962) - Duc d'Ayen
 Hardi Pardaillan! (1964) - Le roi Henri III
 Du grabuge chez les veuves (1964) - Cyril
 Comment épouser un premier ministre (1964) - Un ministre d'État
 Angélique, Marquise des Anges (1964) - L'archevêque de Toulouse Pierre de Marca
 Les gros bras (1964) - Otto Werner
 The Two Orphans (1965) - Le marquis de Presle
 The Second Twin (1966) - Le procureur
 Brigade antigangs (1966) - Le directeur de la P.J.
 Rose rosse per Angelica (1968) - Conte d'Artois
 Maldonne (1969) - Le chef des justiciers
 La battaglia del deserto (1969)
 The Heist (1970) - Le juge d'instruction
 Vertige pour un tueur (1970) - Mario
 Point de chute (1970) - Le père
 Love Me Strangely (1971)
 Sapho ou La fureur d'aimer (1971) - L'oncle Edouard
 Repeated Absences (1972) - Le directeur de la banque
 Décembre (1973)
 La mer couleur de larmes (1980) - Le père René

References

External links

1914 births
1989 deaths
French male film actors
Actors from Antwerp
20th-century French male actors